Visions of Love is the last album of duo Robin and Linda Williams on the Sugar Hill Records label, released in 2002. They would move to Red House Records for their next release.

Visions of Love displays the Williams' A Prairie Home Companion connections with members of that show's house band, Minneapolis musician Peter Ostroushko on fiddle and mandolin plus liner notes by Garrison Keillor.

Track listing 
"I'll Twine 'Mid the Ringlets" (Maude Irving, J. P. Webster) – 4:25
"After the Fire Is Gone" (L. E. White) – 3:00
"You're Running Wild" (Ray Edenton, Donnie Winters) – 2:51
"Ramblin' Man" (Hank Williams) – 4:32
"Wasting My Time, Wasting My Love on You" (Warren) – 2:54
"Too Late, Too Late" (Davis) – 5:02
"Mississippi Delta Blues" (Neville, Rodgers) – 4:01
"The Blues Come Around" (Hank Williams) – 3:01
"Hungry Eyes" (Merle Haggard) – 4:21
"Wash Me in Thy Precious Blood" (Traditional) – 4:09
"Keep the Home Fires Burning" (Lena Guilbert Ford, Ivor Novello) – 4:25
"Wandering Boy" (Traditional) – 3:53
"If I Should Fall Behind" (Bruce Springsteen) – 3:23

Personnel
Linda Williams – vocals, banjo, guitar, background vocals
Robin Williams – vocals, guitar, harmonica, background vocals
Richard Dworsky – piano
Peter Ostroushko – fiddle, mandolin
Gary Raynor – bass

Production notes
Engineered by Sam Hudson
Mastering by David Glaser
Design by Sue Meyer

References

External links
Official Site

2002 albums
Robin and Linda Williams albums